Phytomyza chaerophylli is a species of leaf mining fly in the family Agromyzidae which is found in Europe.

Description
The larvae make a short upper-surface gallery following a leaf margin which widens, so that within the confined limits of some umbelliferous leaves often forms a secondary blotch. The frass is in two untidy rows of isolated grains. Larvae leave the leaf through a semi-circular slit in the lower epidermis to pupate in the soil. Plant species which the fly larva feed on include Sison amomum.

Mines and larvae can be found throughout the winter, the first generation from April to July although larvae can be found feeding through most of the year.

Distribution
Widespread and common throughout much of Europe.

References

Phytomyza
Insects described in 1856
Leaf miners
Muscomorph flies of Europe
Taxa named by Johann Heinrich Kaltenbach